SOHH (Support Online Hip Hop) is a hip hop news website. Felicia Palmer and Steven Samuel founded the website in 1996. In 2000, Rolling Stone magazine writer Mark Binelli called it the "best overall hip-hop site".

History 
Felicia Palmer attended Cornell University to become a veterinarian, but due to the intense science courses, she changed her focus to business management studies. After graduating, she worked for a small licensing firm founded by two young women. She credited her experience there for giving her the motivation to launch SOHH. Her husband, Steven Samuel, was part the rap group, the Troubleneck Brothers, who released their first album, Fuck All Y'all, in 1992. After leaving the group, Samuel worked as a postal foot messenger in New York. Palmer and Samuel officially launched the website in 1996. After twelve months, the membership grew to 75,000 people. Samuel stated, "We picked up a book on HTML and pretty much figured out how to launch the site in a week". SOHH began as a magazine, but was changed to a website due to high printing costs. It is the longest running online hip hop community. The website averages 1.5 million unique visitors a month.

Defacement

In late June 2008, a series of attacks took place against the website. The attack took place in stages, the message board section was infiltrated first, which SOHH then shut down. On June 23, 2008, an apparent hate group which identified themselves as "Anonymous" organized DDOS attacks against the website, successfully eliminating 60% of the website's service capacity. On June 27, 2008, the hackers utilized cross-site scripting to deface the website's main page with satirical images and headlines referencing numerous racial stereotypes and slurs, and also successfully stole information from SOHH employees.

Following the defacement, the website was shut down by its administration. AllHipHop, an unrelated website, also had its forum raided. By the evening of June 27, 2008 AllHipHop.com was back online and released an official statement in which it referred to the perpetrators as "cyber terrorists" announced that it would cooperate with SOHH "...to ensure the capture of these criminals and prevention of repeat offenses."  On June 30, 2008 SOHH placed an official statement regarding the attack on its main page.  The statement alleged that the attackers were "specifically targeting Black, Hispanic, Asian and Jewish youth who ascribe to hip-hop culture," and listed several hip hop oriented websites which it claimed were also attacked by the hackers. It concluded with a notice that it would be cooperating with the FBI.

When interviewed, Felicia Palmer, co-founder of SOHH, confirmed that an FBI probe was ongoing, and that each time the website was attacked, data on the suspects was retrieved.  Palmer indicated that some of the attackers were "located within the United States, between the ages of 16-21" and that a few of them were based in Waco, Texas.  Initially under the impression that the hackers were pranksters, she came to believe they were "beyond pranksters" and the attack was racist in nature.

References

External links 
 

Companies based in Jersey City, New Jersey
Hip hop websites
Internet properties established in 1996
Mass media in Hudson County, New Jersey
American entertainment news websites